Seguenzia transenna is a species of extremely small deep water sea snail, a marine gastropod mollusk in the family Seguenziidae.

Description
The height of this translucent, nacreous, white shell attains 3.1 mm.

Distribution
The type specimen of this marine species was found off New Zealand in the Tasman Basin at a depth of  1029 m.

References

 Marshall, B.A. 1983: Recent and Tertiary Seguenziidae (Mollusca: Gastropoda) from the New Zealand region. New Zealand Journal of Zoology 10: 235-262

External links
 To Encyclopedia of Life
 To World Register of Marine Species

transenna
Gastropods described in 1983